The Montreal Urban Community (MUC) (Communauté Urbaine de Montréal – CUM) was a regional government in Quebec, Canada, that covered all municipalities located on the Island of Montreal and the islands of L'Île-Dorval and Île Bizard from January 1970 (when it was created from the former Jacques-Cartier County) until the end of December 2001. These municipalities were merged into the megacity of Montreal on January 1, 2002. After the partial demergers of 2006, a successor organization was formed, the Urban agglomeration of Montreal.

History 
The supra-municipal level of government provided public transit service and police services. The MUC was first  succeeded by Montreal Metropolitan Community (MMC). Since the merger and subsequent demerger, the MUC has been replaced by the Montreal Agglomeration Council.  This left the MMC in place, so the Agglomeration Council is a supra-municipal entity between the municipal level and the regional municipal level.

See also
 Metropolitan Toronto, Toronto's former analogue of the MUC.

Municipal government of Montreal
History of Montreal

fr:Communauté urbaine de Montréal
pt:Região Metropolitana de Montreal